(from Romansh: Alpine Gate) was a proposed railway station to be located in the middle of the Gotthard Base Tunnel, serving the Alpine village of Sedrun in Switzerland. It was intended to promote tourism and the economy in the region of Graubünden.

The project was put on hold as uneconomical in 2007, and then indefinitely shelved in 2012. The current multifunction station is only used for emergency stops and maintenance.

Design

It would also have connected the high-Alpine village of Sedrun and the Surselva to a major high-speed line from northern to southern Europe. The current station, along with Faido, is one of the two multi-function stations of the tunnel.

This access was used for the construction of the tunnel and is now an emergency exit of the tunnel. Construction costs for a fully functional passenger station were estimated at CHF 50M ($39M, €32M, or £22M) in 2005 with annual operating costs of CHF 2.5M. It was initially projected to be opened in 2016 after the Base Tunnel was scheduled to come into service.

Project history
Proponents of Porta Alpina viewed it both as a potential tourist attraction in its own right, and as a useful transport link to assist the economically challenged Graubünden region. The station would have connected the North/South Gotthard railway line with the East/West Rhaetian Railway/Matterhorn-Gotthard Railway, which would link to the elevator by means of local buses to Sedrun station (MGB) and Disentis station (RhB). This was to have been the fastest public transport link between Zürich and the canton of Graubünden.

The project was initially positively received, and the Swiss parliament approved CHF 7.5M of startup funding in 2005. However, further studies indicated substantial problems including the questionable feasibility of the elevators, the negative impact on tunnel rail capacity and the unprofitability of the whole enterprise. The Swiss Federal Council and the government of the canton of Graubünden announced in September 2007 that the project was put on indefinite hold.

Following renewed interest by private investors in 2012, the Federal Council decided to forgo construction for the time being, while leaving open the possibility of a similar project being implemented by a later generation. A government report stated that the Porta Alpina would have very significantly reduced the base tunnel's freight capacity (unless a passing loop were built, at a large cost for additional tunnelling) and would have been uneconomical to operate, requiring CHF 9M of annual public subsidies.

External links

 Project website (archived link)

References

Cancelled railway stations
Proposed buildings and structures
Buildings and structures in Graubünden
Gotthard railway
Tujetsch